Beyond Reason was a television quiz show seen throughout Canada from 1977 to 1980. Programmes featured a group of experts from various paranormal specialties attempting to find the identity of hidden visitors, resembling a combination of Front Page Challenge,  What's My Line? and The Amazing World of Kreskin.

This CBC Television series was recorded in Winnipeg. Its first season of 13 episodes began airing on 27 June 1977.

Premise 
In each half-hour episode, there are two rounds, each with a hidden guest. The three-member panel usually consists of an astrologer, either a palmist or a graphologist, and a clairvoyant and whose task is to determine the identity of the visiting guest. The astrologer is given only the guest's birth date and time. The palmist only sees a palm print of the guest. The graphologist is given a sample of the guest's handwriting. The clairvoyant is given one of the guest's personal items. Each panelist is seated in his or her own sound-proof booth so that they cannot communicate with each other while attempting to discover the guest's identity. Each panelist is given approximately ninety seconds to make as many statements they believe true about the hidden guest, with one point awarded for every correct assertion confirmed by the guest as true or false. They are awarded an extra twenty points if they correctly guess the guest's identity, with partial points awarded depending on how close their guess of the identity is to reality. The panelist with the most points at the end of the episode is declared the winner of that episode.

Hosts 
Journalist Allen Spraggett (seasons 1–2) 
CBC announcer Bill Guest (seasons 1–2)
Actor/comedian Paul Soles (season 3)

Panelists 
Marcel Broekman (palmistry)
Geoff Gray-Cobb (astrology)
Irene Hughes (clairvoyance)
Barbara Justason (astrology)
Sandra McNeil (clairvoyance)
Marilyn Rossner (graphology)

References

External links
 CBC Archives: "CBC game show with a paranormal twist", video excerpt, accessed 27 September 2006
 Queen's University Directory of CBC Television Series: Beyond Reason, accessed 27 September 2006
 

1970s Canadian game shows
1980s Canadian game shows
1977 Canadian television series debuts
1980 Canadian television series endings
CBC Television original programming
Paranormal television
Television shows filmed in Winnipeg